La Cura may refer to:

"La Cura", 1985 song by Frankie Ruiz from the album Solista pero no solo
"La Cura", 1996 song by Franco Battiato from the album L'imboscata
"La Cura", 2003 song by La Banda Gorda
La Cura, 2006 album by Thirstin Howl III
"La Cura", 2013 song by Dyland & Lenny